is a Japanese professional wrestler currently working as a freelancer and is best known for her time in Ice Ribbon and Pure-J, two Japanese professional wrestling promotions.

Professional wrestling career

Independent circuit (2018–present) 
As a freelancer, Suzuki is known for competing in various promotions. At Now Was The First Of Osaka This Year, an event promoted by Oz Academy on February 17, 2019, she fell short to Hiroyo Matsumoto. At AWG Beginning, an event promoted by Actwres girl'Z on May 19, 2019, Suzuki teamed up with Hikari Shimizu in a losing effort to Saori Anou and Noa Igarashi. Pro At a house show promoted by Big Japan Pro Wrestling on November 10, 2019, Suzuki teamed up with Tsukasa Fujimoto in a losing effort to Risa Sera and Maika Ozaki. 

At Seadlinnng's 6th Anniversary from August 19, 2021, she teamed up with Ayame Sasamura and Rina Yamashita in a losing effort to Hiroyo Matsumoto, Nanae Takahashi and Tsukushi Haruka. At FMW-E Battle Royal, an event promoted by Frontier Martial-Arts Wrestling on September 12, 2019, Suzuki teamed up with Isami Kodaka in a losing effort to Abdullah Kobayashi and Risa Sera as a result of a intergender tag team match.

Ice Ribbon (2018–present) 
Suzuki made her professional wrestling debut in Ice Ribbon's New Ice Ribbon #930 ~ RibbonMania 2018 from December 31 where she picked up a victory against Asahi. At New Ice Ribbon #1013 ~ RibbonMania 2019 on December 31, Suzuki competed in a 45-person gauntlet match which portraited Tequila Saya's retirement match in which she faced the likes of Syuri, Manami Toyota, Matsuya Uno, Kaori Yoneyama, Ken Ohka, Cherry and many others in a draw.

At New Ice Ribbon #1073 she teamed up with Risa Sera and unsuccessfully challenged Frank Sisters (Hiragi Kurumi and Mochi Miyagi) for the International Ribbon Tag Team Championship. At Yokohama Bunka Gymnasium Final from August 9, 2020, Suzuki defeated Maya Yukihi to win the ICE Cross Infinity Championship. At Ice Ribbon Risa Sera's 5th Produced Show on October 24, 2020, Suzuki competed in an 11-person ironman match for the FantastICE Championship also involving the champion Risa Sera, Minoru Fujita, Takashi Sasaki, Takayuki Ueki, Toshiyuki Sakuda, Yuko Miyamoto and others which ended in a 60 minute time-limit draw.

World Wonder Ring Stardom (2022–present)

Suzuki aligned herself with Mochi Miyagi, Risa Sera, Akane Fujita and Hiragi Kurumi in the Prominence stable at the end of 2021 after their contract with Ice Ribbon expired, leaving them to wander as freelance wrestlers.  Suzuki and the rest of the stable made their first appearance in World Wonder Ring Stardom's first pay-per-view of 2022, the Stardom Nagoya Supreme Fight from January 29 where they picked a fight with the Donna Del Mondo stable, subsequently starting a feud with them, especially against the unit's leader Giulia. On the first night of the Stardom World Climax 2022 from March 26, Suzuki teamed up with her Prominence stablemate Risa Sera to defeat Donna Del Mondo's (Maika & Thekla). On the second night of the event from March 27, she teamed up with her stablemates Akane Fujita, Mochi Miyagi and Risa Sera in a losing effort against Donna Del Mondo's team of Giulia, Himeka, Maika & Thekla. At Stardom New Blood 2 on May 13, 2022, Suzuki picked up a victory over Mai Sakurai. At Stardom Flashing Champions on May 28, 2022, Suzuki teamed up with Akane Fujita and Mochi Natsumi to defeat Cosmic Angels team of Unagi Sayaka, Mina Shirakawa and Waka Tsukiyama. At Stardom New Blood 3 on July 8, 2022, Suzuki went into a time-limit draw against Mirai. At Stardom in Showcase vol.1 on July 23, she teamed up with Risa Sera to face Giulia and Mai Sakurai in a hardcore match, winning in a dominant fashion and continuing the Prominence/DDM feud. At Mid Summer Champions in Nagoya, the second event of the Stardom Mid Summer Champions series which took place on July 24, 2022, Suzuki teamed up with Risa Sera and Hiragi Kurumi to defeat Cosmic Angels (Mina Shirakawa, Unagi Sayaka & Hikari Shimizu) and Queen's Quest (Lady C, Hina & Miyu Amasaki). At Stardom in Showcase vol.2 on September 25, 2022, Suzuki defeated Starlight Kid in a 5 Star Grand Prix Tournament match. She finished with 15 points in the "Blue Block" of the 2022 Grand Prix after competing against Mirai, Mayu Iwatani, Hazuki, Saya Kamitani, Starlight Kid, Natsupoi, Momo Watanabe, Ami Sourei, Mina Shirakawa, Saya Iida, Hanan and Giulia. She fought the Donna Del Mondo leader on October 1, on the finals of the tournament. At Stardom Dream Queendom 2 on December 29, 2022, Suzuki teamed up with Risa Sera and Hiragi Kurumi and defeated Oedo Tai (Starlight Kid, Momo Watanabe and Saki Kashima) to win the Artist of Stardom Championship.

At the 2023 edition of the Triangle Derby, Suzuki will team up with Sera and Kurumi and compete in the "Triangle Blue" where they will face the teams of Rebel&Enemy (Ram Kaicho, Maika Ozaki and Maya Yukihi), Lollipop (Waka Tsukiyama, Yuko Sakurai and Rina Amikura),  Classmates (Hazuki, Koguma and Saya Iida), MaiHime with C (Maika, Himeka and Lady C), Abarenbo GE (Syuri, Mirai and Ami Sourei), and Oedo Tai (Natsuko Tora, Momo Watanabe and Saki Kashima).

Championships and accomplishments
Ice Ribbon
ICE Cross Infinity Championship (1 time)
Ice Ribbon Year End Awards (2 times)
MVP Award (2020)
Best Match Award (2020) – 
 Pro Wrestling Illustrated
 Ranked No. 41 of the top 150 female wrestlers in the PWI Women's 150 in 2022
Pro Wrestling Wave
Wave Single Championship (1 time)
Catch the Wave (2022)
Pure-J
Princess of Pro Wrestling Championship (1 time)
World Wonder Ring Stardom
 Artist of Stardom Championship (1 time, current)
 Triangle Derby (2023) 
 5★Star GP Award (1 time)
 5★Star GP Best Match Award (2022) –

References 

2002 births
Living people
Japanese female professional wrestlers
People from Miyazaki Prefecture
Japanese sportspeople
21st-century professional wrestlers
Artist of Stardom Champions